Harry Gannes (1900–1941), was a British-born American journalist, foreign editor of the Daily Worker during much of the 1930s, was a communist of national prominence.

Biography
Harry Gannes was one of the founders (in 1922) of the Young Workers League, the predecessor of the Young Communist League, serving briefly as its general secretary. As foreign editor of the Daily Worker he was a mentor to Theodore Draper, with whom he coauthored Spain in Revolt in 1936. His book When China Unites, 1937, based on research and experiences during a trip to China in 1932-33, describes the Kuomintang–Communist alliance of the mid-1920s and the confrontations between the two parties from 1927 on. Gannes traveled to China, and later to Europe (1938) using a passport under the name Henry George Jacobs. For this he was indicted for passport fraud in 1939. At almost the same time, he fell ill and was diagnosed with a brain tumor, from which he died on 3 January 1941.

Footnotes

Published works

Books 
Spain in Revolt : A History of the Civil War in Spain, 1936, with Theodore Draper
When China Unites An Interpretive History Of The Chinese Revolution, 1937

Pamphlets  

 Youth under Americanism.  With George Oswald. Chicago: Young Workers League of America, 1922.
 Yankee Colonies Imperialist Rule in the Philippines, Porto Rico, Hawaii and Other Possessions. New York: International Pamphlets,  1930.
 Graft and Gangsters. Jacob Burck, illustrator. New York City: Workers Library Publishers, 1931.
 Kentucky Miners Fight New York: Workers International Relief, 1932.
 The Economic Crisis: An Analysis of the Course of the Crisis up to June 15, 1931. New York: Communist Party USA, 1932.
 Soviets in Spain: The October Armed Uprising against Fascism. New York: Workers Library Publishers, 1935 
 War in Africa Italian Fascism Prepares to Enslave Ethiopia.  New York: Workers Library Publishers, 1935.
 Spain Defends Democracy: The Truth about the Fascist Plot. New York: Workers Library Publishers, 1936.
 How the Soviet Union Helps Spain. New York: Workers Library Publishers, 1936.
 The Munich Betrayal. New York City: Workers Library Publishers, 1938.

1900 births
1941 deaths
American journalists
British emigrants to the United States